Paul Phillips may refer to:
Paul Phillips (baseball) (born 1977), Major League Baseball catcher 
Paul Phillips (guitarist) (born 1975), lead guitarist for the band Puddle of Mudd
Paul Phillips (singer), English singer-songwriter
Paul Phillips (poker player) (born 1972), American software engineer, entrepreneur and poker player
Paul Phillips (conductor) (born 1956), American conductor, composer and music scholar
Paul Phillips (bodhran) (1959–2007), Irish bodhrán player and teacher
Paul Phillips, pilot of DHL Flight 611, which crashed into Bashkirian Airlines Flight 2937 in mid-air
Paul Phillips, solicitor to Lamin Fhimah in the Pan Am Flight 103 bombing trial 
Paul Phillips, principal of Weston College